Carl Safina (born May 23, 1955) is an American ecologist and author of books and other writings about the human relationship with the natural world. His books include Becoming Wild: How Animal Cultures Raise Families, Create Beauty, and Achieve Peace; Beyond Words:  What Animals Think and Feel; Song for the Blue Ocean; Eye of the Albatross; The View From Lazy Point: A Natural Year in an Unnatural World; and others. He is the founding president of the Safina Center, and is inaugural holder of the Carl Safina Endowed Chair for Nature and Humanity at Stony Brook University. Safina hosted the PBS series Saving the Ocean with Carl Safina.

Early life 
Carl Safina was born in Brooklyn, New York to Italian Americans (his grandparents were from Sicily.) At age ten he moved with his family into the new and rapidly expanding suburbs of Long Island, New York. As a teen Safina spent free hours fishing, camping, and hiking near his home. Rapid building and construction on Long Island caused him to witness destruction of woodlands and other natural habitats, which made another deep and personal impression. Eventually he chose to major in environmental science at the State University of New York at Purchase. Later at Rutgers University he earned master's and PhD degrees in ecology for his studies of seabirds.

Career
Carl Safina works to show that nature and human dignity require each other. His recent works probe the ways in which our relationship with the natural world affects human relations, and how the scientific facts imply the need for moral and ethical responses. His most recent books explore cognitive and emotional capacities of the minds of other animals, as well as individuality and cultural learning in free-living animals.

His early research focused on seabird ecology. In the 1990s he drew attention to environmental issues in fisheries. He led campaigns to ban high-seas driftnets, to re-write U.S. federal fisheries law, to work toward international conservation of tunas, sharks, and other fishes, and to achieve passage of a United Nations global fisheries treaty.

His more recent writings are about ecology, conservation, and humanity broadly. He has written about a wide array of issues and creatures of ocean and land, including tunas, salmon, sharks, sea turtles, seabirds, albatrosses, elephants, wolves, orca whales, sperm whales, dolphins, chimpanzees, macaws, forests, coral reefs, and sustainable food. Safina is an advocate of animal welfare. In regard to captive animals and zoos he has stated that "ethically we have a responsibility to do the best we can to avoid harm and  discomfort, and to continue to learn to  improve the physical and psychological health of our captives".

His first book, Song for the Blue Ocean, was chosen as a New York Times Notable Book of the Year, a Los Angeles Times best nonfiction selection, a Library Journal best science book selection, and won the Lannan Literary Award for nonfiction. His second book, Eye of the Albatross, won the John Burroughs Medal and the National Academies' communications award for the year's best book. Safina's Voyage of the Turtle was a New York Times Editors' Choice. In 2011, The View From Lazy Point was a New York Times Editors' Choice, a National Geographic Travelers book of the month and received the Orion Book Award. Also in 2011, his chronicle of the Deepwater Horizon oil spill, A Sea in Flames, was a New York Times Editors' Choice. He also authored Beyond Words: What Animals Think and Feel, and in 2010 published a children's book, Nina Delmar: The Great Whale Rescue. His work has been featured in National Geographic and in The New York Times and other publications. He contributed a new foreword to Rachel Carson's seminal work, The Sea Around Us.

Safina is inaugural holder of the Endowed Chair for Nature and Humanity at Stony Brook University and president of The Safina Center. He has a Ph.D. in ecology from Rutgers University and has been awarded honorary doctorates from the State University of New York, Long Island University and Drexel University. He has been a visiting fellow at Yale University and a senior fellow with the World Wildlife Fund. Safina is also a MacArthur Fellow, a Guggenheim Fellow, a Pew Fellow in Marine conservation, an Utne Reader visionary, and a recipient of Chicago's Brookfield Zoo's Rabb Medal. Safina was named among "100 Notable Conservationists of the 20th Century" by Audubon magazine, and featured on the Bill Moyers PBS special Earth on Edge. His 10-part TV series, Saving the Ocean with Carl Safina, premiered on PBS in April 2011. Safina has been profiled on Nightline and in The New York Times.

Bibliography
Becoming Wild: How Animal Cultures Raise Families, Create Beauty, and Achieve Peace. Henry Holt and Co. (2020). 
Beyond Words: What Animals Think and Feel. Henry Holt and Co. (2015). 
The View from Lazy Point: A Natural Year in an Unnatural World. Henry Holt and Co. (2011). 
A Sea in Flames: The Deepwater Horizon Oil Blowout. Crown Publishers. (2011). 
Nina Delmar: The Great Whale Rescue Illustrated by Dawn Navarro Ericson. Blue Ocean Institute. (2010). 
Voyage of the Turtle: In Pursuit of the Earth's Last Dinosaur. Henry Holt and Co. (May 30, 2006). 
Eye of the Albatross: Visions of Hope and Survival. Henry Holt and Co. (May 14, 2002). 
Song for the Blue Ocean: Encounters Along the World's Coasts and Beneath the Seas. Henry Holt and Co. (January 1998).

References

External links

 Personal website
 Biography of Carl Safina in Current Biography Magazine
 Safina Center official website
 Carl Safina on the BP Oil Spill’s Ecological Impact on the Gulf Coast and Worldwide - video report by Democracy Now!

1955 births
21st-century American zoologists
21st-century American male writers
American animal welfare scholars
American animal welfare workers
American conservationists
American ecologists
Animal cognition writers
Fellows of the Explorers Club
Fisheries scientists
John Burroughs Medal recipients
Living people
MacArthur Fellows
Rutgers University alumni
State University of New York at Purchase alumni
American people of Italian descent